Syed Mushtaq Ali (10 July 1942 – 2 March 2010) was a field hockey player from India who won a gold medal with the Men's National Team at the 1964 Summer Olympics in Tokyo.

Notes

References

External links
 

1942 births
2010 deaths
Field hockey players from Bhopal
Olympic field hockey players of India
Olympic gold medalists for India
Field hockey players at the 1964 Summer Olympics
Olympic medalists in field hockey
Indian male field hockey players
Medalists at the 1964 Summer Olympics
Recipients of the Dhyan Chand Award